The 2022 Extreme E Championship was the second season of the Extreme E electric off-road racing series.

Calendar
On 24 September 2021, a provisional five-round calendar was revealed, which included a return to Saudi Arabia for the season opener in February, an African event, a second Arctic X-Prix in Greenland or Iceland, and two trips to South America. A further update was announced on 22 December 2021. Saudi Arabia and Sardinia return from the previous year, with new events to be held in Chile, Uruguay and either Scotland or Senegal. The latter was later cancelled on 8 April due to financial issues, with Sardinia postponed until July and now set to host two events.

The following events were cancelled:

Race format
Rule changes regarding the race format were introduced for the start of the season. Qualifying now consists of one round of qualifying time trial and another of qualifying races, with the latter comprising two five-car heats. The intermediate classification points system was kept but updated to accommodate the introduction of heats (10 points for the time trial winner down to 1 for the last-placed team; 10, 8, 6, 4 and 2 for the heats), but championship points are no longer awarded based on combined qualifying results, in an attempt to put the primary focus on the races. The progression to the semi-finals was also slightly tweaked: fourth and fifth now advance to semi-final 1, while sixth moves on to semi-final 2; as a new team entered the championship, four cars now compose the "crazy race". Lastly, a new scoring system akin to the one used in Formula 1, albeit with the five extra points for the "super sector", was implemented.

Teams and drivers
The following teams and drivers were contracted to compete in the 2022 Championship. All teams used one of the identical Odyssey 21 electric SUVs manufactured by Spark Racing Technology, with Abt Cupra XE and Chip Ganassi Racing running modified bodyworks. Each team consists of a male and a female driver, who share a car and have equal driving duties.

 Klara Andersson was scheduled to compete for Xite Energy Racing, but did not appear at any rounds.

Results and standings

X-Prix

Scoring system
Points are awarded to the top ten finishers. An additional 5 points are given to the fastest team in the Super Sector over the whole weekend.

Only the best four X-Prix results count towards the drivers' championship.

Drivers' Championship standings

Teams' Championship standings

Notes

References

External links
 

2022 Extreme E Championship
Extreme E seasons
Extreme E